Boris Andreyevich Mikhailov or Borys Andriyovych Mykhailov (born 25 August 1938) is a Soviet and Ukrainian photographer. He has been awarded the Hasselblad Award and the Citibank Private Bank Photography Prize.

Life and work
Mykhailov was born in Kharkiv, Ukraine. He received an education as an engineer and started to teach himself photography. He had a four-decade career as a Soviet factory photographer. His work combines conceptual art and social documentary photography.

Mikhailov had his first exhibition at the end of the 1960s. After the KGB found nude pictures of his wife he was laid off his job as an engineer and started to work full-time as a photographer. From 1968 to 1975 he shot several series documenting everyday scenes, the best known of them being the Red series. In these photographs he mainly used the colour red, to picture people, groups and city-life. Red symbolized the October Revolution, political party and the social system of Soviet society. According to Sabina Jaskot-Gill for Tate, "By drawing attention to the inescapable presence of the colour in the Ukrainian social landscape, the series suggests the extent to which communist ideology had permeated all aspects of Soviet life."

In Mykhailov's Klebrigkeit (1982), he added explanatory notes, or diary-like text.

In Case History, he examines the consequences of the breakdown of the Soviet Union for its people. He systematically took pictures of homeless people. It shows the situation of people who after the breakdown of the Soviet Union were not able to find their place in a secure social system. In a very direct way Mykhailov points out his critique against the "mask of beauty" of the emerging post-Soviet capitalistic way of life.

In 2004 Mykhailov first exhibited in Berlin in an exhibition concerning people living at the edge of society. He subsequently moved from Ukraine to Germany, where he resides as of 2022.

Publications
If I were a German. Dresden: Verlag der Kunst Dresden, 1995. 
Boris Mikhailov. Stuttgart: Oktagon, 1995. .
By the Ground. Stuttgart: Oktagon, 1996. .
At DUSK. Stuttgart: Oktagon, 1996. .
Unfinished Dissertation. Zurich: Scalo, 1998. . With an essay by Margarita Tupitsyn.
Case History. Zurich: Scalo, 1999. .
Boris Mikhailov: The Hasselblad Award 2000. Zurich: Scalo, 2001. .
Äußere Ruhe / Äussere Ruhe (Drucksache N.F. 4). Düsseldorf: Richter, 2000. . Photographs and Russian text. Includes a German translation of the photograph notes, an interview with the artist (in German) by Marina Achenbach, and biographies (in German). Edition of 1000 copies.
Boris Mikhailov. Phaidon 55 series. London: Phaidon, 2000.
Salt Lake. 2002 
Boris Mikhailov: A Retrospective.
Zurich: Scalo, 2003. .
Eine Retrospektive.
Look at Me I Look at Water . . . or Perversion of Repose, Göttingen: Steidl, 2004. .
Crimean Snobbism. Tokyo: Rathole, 2006.
Suzi Et Cetera. Cologne: Walther König, 2007. .
Yesterday's Sandwich. London: Phaidon, 2009. .
Maquette Braunschweig. 2010. 
The Wedding. London: Mörel Books, 2011. .
Tea Coffee Cappuccino. Cologne: Walther König, 2011. .
Time is out of Joint. Berlin: Distanz, 2012. .
I Am Not. London: Morel, 2015. . With a text by Simon Baker. Edition of 500 copies.
Suzi et Cetera (Part 2). 89 Books, 2019.
Yesterday's Sandwich II. Tokyo: Super Labo, 2019.

Exhibitions

Solo exhibitions
2001: Saatchi Gallery, London.
2001: Case History & Heiner Müller Project, Haus der Kulturen der Welt, Berlin.
2002: The Insulted and the Injured, Pace/MacGill Gallery, New York.
2003: Private Freuden, lastende Langweile, öffentlicher Zerfall - eine Retrospective, Fotomuseum Winterthur, Winterthur, Switzerland.
2004: Institute of Contemporary Art, Boston, MA.
2004: Palau de la Virreina, Barcelona.
2005: Look at me I look at Water, Centre de la Photographie, Geneve.
2006: Twilight: Photography in the Magic Hour, Victoria and Albert Museum, London
2011: Case History, Museum of Modern Art, New York
2019: The Forbidden Image, PinchukArtCentre, Kyiv
2019: The Space between Us, Kunsthalle Baden Baden, Germany
2019: Boris Mikhailov: Before Sleep / After Drinking, C/O Berlin, Berlin
2022/23: Boris Mikhailov: Ukrainian Diary, Maison européenne de la photographie, Paris
2022/23: At Dusk, Bourse de Commerce, Paris

Group exhibitions
1993/1994: New Photography 9: Christopher Giglio, Boris Mihailov, Mark Steinmetz, and Beat Streuli, Museum of Modern Art, New York
2001: Citibank Private Bank Photography Prize, The Photographers' Gallery, London
 2009: Ça me touche, Rencontres d'Arles festival, Arles, France. Curated by Nan Goldin.
 2012: Revolution vs Revolution, Beirut Art Center, Beirut, Lebanon

Awards
 1996: Award of Coutts Contemporary Art Foundation, Switzerland
 2000: Hasselblad Foundation International Award in Photography, Sweden
 2001: Winner, Citibank Private Bank Photography Prize (later renamed Deutsche Börse Photography Foundation Prize), The Photographers' Gallery, London
 2001: Foto-Buchpreis der Krazna-Krausz-Stiftung, London (Kraszna-Krausz Book Award)

Collections
Mikhailov's work is held in the following permanent collections:
Metropolitan Museum of Art, New York: 6 prints (as of 13 January 2023)
Museum of Modern Art, New York: 43 prints (as of 13 January 2023)
Tate, UK: 15 prints (as of 13 January 2023)
Victoria and Albert Museum, London: 7 prints (as of 13 January 2023)

See also 
 Kharkiv School of Photography

Notes

References

Living people
1938 births
Ukrainian photographers
Soviet photographers
Artists from Kharkiv
Members of the Academy of Arts, Berlin
Ukrainian contemporary artists